The Keeper (aka Trautmann) is a British-German biographical film directed by Marcus H. Rosenmüller and starring German actor David Kross as the footballer Bert Trautmann. Although the subject of the film was an athlete, the film has been described as "not primarily a sports film" but instead a drama.

The film premiered at the 2018 Zurich Film Festival, and was released in Germany under the title Trautmann on 14 March 2019. It was released in the UK and Ireland on 5 April 2019.

Plot 
In 1945, German paratrooper Bert Trautmann (David Kross) is captured while fighting in the forests near Kleve. Transferred to a British POW camp in Lancashire, he and his comrades are kept under strict conditions and made to work to repair the damage their country has caused to the surrounding area. Jack Friar (John Henshaw), a local tradesman and manager of non-league side St Helens Town, spots Trautmann keeping goal against other POWs during a trip to deliver treats to the camp commander and bribes the commander into allowing Trautmann to be allowed out of the camp, whereupon he recruits him to play as goalkeeper for his relegation-threatened side.

Although the war has recently ended with the defeat of Nazi Germany, the other players are angered to be asked to play alongside a man who is from a country they were until recently at war with, but with little other option they agree to take to the field. A string of strong performances see the players slowly come to accept Bert's place in the team. As a condition of his continuing appearances, Friar agrees to let Bert help work in his shop, leading Friar's daughter Margaret (Freya Mavor) to soften her initially-hostile stance, and the pair begin an unlikely romance.

As St Helens Town come to their crunch relegation-deciding match at the end of the season, it is announced that the war's end has led to an offer for the German POWs to be repatriated. Although Trautmann is free to return to his home in Bremen, he instead chooses to stay to support his side. After the match, Manchester City manager Jock Thomson (Gary Lewis), who has come on a scouting mission, approaches Bert and offers him a place in his City team to replace the retiring Frank Swift. At their end-of-season party, his teammates present him with a hamper to take home to his family, but Bert's growing connection with Margaret leads him instead to stay, and in due course they are married.

In 1949, Bert travels to Manchester to sign for City. The press conference for his arrival rapidly turns hostile as the Manchester press – representing a city with a large Jewish population – demand Bert answer questions on his military background. Protesting crowds form outside Maine Road, and the City supporters barrage him with booing, but Thomson and his City side refuse to join them, instead stating "there's no war in this dressing room".

At an acrimonious meeting with season ticketholders, Thomson and the City board struggle to contain the fury of the city's residents, but a passionate plea by Margaret strikes home with the influential Rabbi Altmann (Butz Ulrich Buse), who writes an open letter to the city published in a local paper asking them to examine all men individually without national bias. Following Altmann's letter, and with continuing fine performances on the field, the mood shifts and soon Trautmann is even being welcomed by players of other teams around the country.

By 1956 Bert and Margaret are living an idyllic existence with their young son John, while Manchester City's strong run has led them to the FA Cup Final. As City take a strong 3–1 lead, Bert is again winning plaudits for his masterful goalkeeping, when a dangerous collision with Birmingham City player Peter Murphy shatters a vertebra in his neck and almost costs him his life. With 20 minutes of the game left to go, and clearly in a bad state, Trautmann refuses to leave the field and continues to make several brave saves, stopping Birmingham City from scoring any further goals and thus winning City the cup.

His joy leads to tragedy, however, as during his recuperation his son is hit by a car and killed. Their heartbreak causes Margaret to grow more distant from Bert, while he himself becomes convinced that his loss is a karmic consequence of his inaction when witnessing war atrocities in Ukraine, and the film leaves them still working through the resulting difficulties in their marriage. As the film ends with footage of Trautmann's continuing City career, overlaid text reveals that Trautmann would continue to play for Manchester City until 1964, would be named the first foreign recipient of the English Player of the Year title, and would in time be recognised by both the British and German governments for his work in promoting Anglo-German relations.

Cast 
 David Kross as Bert Trautmann
 Freya Mavor as Margaret Friar
 John Henshaw as Jack Friar
 Dervla Kirwan as Clarice Friar
 Dave Johns as Roberts
 Harry Melling as Sergeant Smythe
 Chloe Harris as Betsy
 Mikey Collins as Alf Myers
 Gary Lewis as Jock Thomson
 Michael Socha as Bill Twist
 Angus Barnett as Clive Thornton
 Stuart Donaghy as lead football team-mate
 Butz Ulrich Buse as Rabbi Altmann
 Tony Wright / VerseChorusVerse as Ice Cream Man

Production 
Before Trautmann's death in 2013, Rosenmüller and Marciniak spent several days interviewing him about details for inclusion in the film.

Principal photography began in Belfast on 8 June 2017.

Release 
The film premiered at the Zurich Film Festival on 1 October 2018, and was released in Germany under the title Trautmann on 14 March 2019. It was released in the UK on 5 April 2019.

Reception

Box office 
The Keeper grossed a worldwide total of $2.1 million, against a production budget of about $13.4 million.

Critical response 
The website's critics consensus reads: "The Keeper strays into easy sentimentality, but this fact-based drama's warm spirit makes its indulgences easy to forgive." On Metacritic, the film holds a weighted average score of 52 out of 100, based on 6 critics, indicating "mixed or average reviews".

Awards

References

External links 
 
 

2018 films
British association football films
Drama films based on actual events
Manchester City F.C.
2018 biographical drama films
2010s sports drama films
German association football films
British sports drama films
German sports drama films
British biographical drama films
German biographical drama films
English-language German films
British World War II films
Films set in the United Kingdom
Films set in Lancashire
Films set in Manchester
Films set in 1944
Films set in 1945
Films set in 1949
Films set in 1956
Films shot in Northern Ireland
2018 drama films
2010s English-language films
2010s British films
German World War II films
2010s German films